Riders of Death Valley is a 1941 American Western film serial from Universal Pictures. It was a high budget serial with an all-star cast led by Dick Foran and Buck Jones. Ford Beebe and Ray Taylor directed. It also features Lon Chaney Jr. in a supporting role as a villainous henchman as well as Noah Beery Jr., Charles Bickford, Guinn "Big Boy" Williams, Monte Blue, Roy Barcroft, Richard Alexander and Glenn Strange.

Plot
The villainous Wolf Reade and his gang set out to discover the location of a lost mine and lay claim to it.

Cast

Production
Riders of Death Valley was Universal's "all-star, high-budget western cliffhanger." It provided a lot of stock footage for later serials.

Stunts
 Jack Casey
 Leroy Johnson 
 Gil Perkins
 Ken Terrell doubling George J. Lewis
 Duke York

Chapter titles
 Death Marks the Trail
 The Menacing Herd
 The Plunge of Peril
 Flaming Fury
 The Avalanche of Doom
 Blood and Gold
 Death Rides the Storm
 Descending Doom
 Death Holds the Reins
 Devouring Flames
 The Fatal Blast
 Thundering Doom
 Bridge of Disaster
 A Fight to the Death
 The Harvest of Hate
Source:

See also
 List of film serials
 List of film serials by studio

References

External links

1941 films
American black-and-white films
1940s English-language films
Universal Pictures film serials
Films directed by Ford Beebe
Films directed by Ray Taylor
1941 Western (genre) films
American Western (genre) films
Films with screenplays by George H. Plympton
1940s American films